John A. Newell  (January 14, 1868 – January 23, 1919), was a Major League Baseball infielder. He played in five games for the 1891 Pittsburgh Pirates of the National League. His career continued in the minor leagues through 1898.

External links

1868 births
1919 deaths
Major League Baseball third basemen
Baseball players from Wilmington, Delaware
Pittsburgh Pirates players
19th-century baseball players
Wilmington Blue Hens players
New Orleans Pelicans (baseball) players
Toledo Black Pirates players
Memphis Fever Germs players
Sioux City Cornhuskers players
Indianapolis Hoosiers (minor league) players
Indianapolis Indians players
Wilmington Peaches players
Grand Rapids Bob-o-links players
Reading Actives players
Hartford Bluebirds players
Paterson Silk Weavers players
Reading Coal Heavers players